St. John's Burying Ground was a cemetery bounded by Varick Street, Leroy Street, Hudson Street and Clarkson Street in the Greenwich Village neighborhood of Lower Manhattan.  The ground was connected with St. John's Chapel of Trinity Parish from 1834 to 1898, although many of the burials predate the cemetery's acquisition by the church.  The last burials were in about 1860. It is estimated that about 10,000 people were buried there.

In 1897, the cemetery was made into a public park by the city of New York.  Only about 250 bodies were removed.  The new park was called St. John's Park, but later became known as Hudson Park, and is now called James J. Walker Park. Tony Dapolito Outdoor Pool and Community Center and Hudson Park Library were built on the old cemetery grounds.

The only remnant that remains of the park's time as a cemetery is the firemen's monument, which was erected by Engine Company 13 to Eugene Underhill and Frederick A. Ward, who were killed at a fire in 1834.  The monument used to be at their grave site, but it was moved in 1898.

Notable burials
 Theodosia Bartow Burr First wife of Aaron Burr
 William Evans Burton English actor, playwright, theater manager and publisher
 Thomas S. Hamblin English actor and theatre manager
 Frances Hodgkinson, actress, wife of actor John Hodgkinson
Helen Jewett Murder victim

Gallery

See also
 James J. Walker Park

References

External links

 
 St. John's Old Burying Ground according to the New York Public Library Blog
 St John's Cemetery Research on New York City Cemetery Project Webpage
 New York Parks & Recreation History of James J Walker Park, formerly St. John's Burying Ground
 NY Post Article on Hidden Cemeteries of NYC
 6sqft Hidden Graveyards Blog Post Referencing Plot Image of St John's Burying Ground
 Dayton in Manhattan Independent Research on Burying Ground Below Ballfield
 Ephemeral New York Research on Old St. John's Burying Ground

Cemeteries in Manhattan
Greenwich Village
Anglican cemeteries in the United States
1897 disestablishments in New York (state)
Former cemeteries
Cemeteries established in the 1830s